Ceredigion Museum is a museum in Aberystwyth, Ceredigion, Wales.

Location 
Ceredigion Museum is located at the Coliseum, Terrace Road, Aberystwyth. It is housed in a restored Edwardian theatre and is managed by Ceredigion County Council.

History 
The museum was established in 1972 by the Cardiganshire Antiquarian Society who gave it to the newly formed Ceredigion District Council in 1974. In 1996, it was transferred to Ceredigion County Council.

Exhibition and collection 
The Ceredigion Museum aims to reflect the history and archaeology of the county. There are notable collections of Welsh furniture, costume and many objects associated with the county's farming and agricultural heritage. There is a collection of taxidermy by the Hutchings family (1870s–1942) and many paintings by Alfred Worthington (1835–1925). The museum organises temporary exhibitions on local history and art, and has displays at Lampter Library, the Kite Centre in Tregaron and the Harbourmaster's office in New Quay. It also owns a cottage at Llanon which is open during most August afternoons.

Friends organisation 
The museum is supported by the Friends of Ceredigion Museum.

External links 

 
 Ceredigion Museum's displays and collections 
 Ceredigion Museum’s Welsh costume collection
 170 Items on Gathering the Jewels web site
 Coliseum, Aberystwyth, in the Theatres Trust Database

Museums in Ceredigion
Local museums in Wales
Aberystwyth
Museums established in 1972
1972 establishments in Wales
Theatres in Wales
Grade II listed buildings in Ceredigion